Giants of Africa is a Canadian documentary film, directed by Hubert Davis and released in 2016. The film centres on Nigerian-Canadian sports executive Masai Ujiri's Basketball Without Borders program to promote and build the sport of basketball in Africa.

The film garnered two Canadian Screen Award nominations at the 5th Canadian Screen Awards in 2017, for Best Editing in a Documentary (Dave De Carlo) and Best Cinematography in a Documentary (Chris Romeike). It won the award for Best Editing.

References

External links
 
 

2016 documentary films
Canadian sports documentary films
Films directed by Hubert Davis
Documentary films about Africa
Documentary films about basketball
Basketball in Africa
Canadian basketball films
Documentary films about Black Canadians
2010s English-language films
2010s Canadian films